Kenneally is a surname. Notable people with the surname include:

 Billy Kenneally, his son, also an Irish politician
 Brendan Kenneally, his son, also an Irish politician
 Christine Kenneally, Australian-American journalist
 Christy Kenneally (born 1948), Irish author
 Dean Kenneally, Australian physiotherapist
 James Jerome Kenneally, Australian author
 John Patrick Kenneally (born Leslie Robinson), Victoria Cross recipient
 John Kenneally (hurler), Irish hurler
 Mary Kenneally, Australian writer, winner of the Kenneth Myer Medallion for the Performing Arts in 2000
 Siassie Kenneally (1969–2018), Inuit artist
 William Kenneally, Irish politician

Keneally is a variant spelling:
 Gavin Keneally, Australian politician
 Kristina Keneally, Australian politician
 Mike Keneally, American musician
 Thomas Keneally, Australian novelist

Kennealy is a variant spelling:
 Patricia Kennealy-Morrison, American novelist, former rock critic
 William Kenealy, Irish recipient of the Victoria Cross

See also
Kennelly (disambiguation)